Jaroslav Kasík is a Czech professional ice hockey defenceman who played with HK SKP Poprad in the Slovak Extraliga during the 2010–11 season.

Career statistics

External links

Living people
1983 births
BK Mladá Boleslav players
HC Berounští Medvědi players
HC Kobra Praha players
HC Oceláři Třinec players
HC Slovan Ústečtí Lvi players
HC Sparta Praha players
HC Vítkovice players 
HK Poprad players
Motor České Budějovice players
Piráti Chomutov players
Czech ice hockey defencemen
Ice hockey people from Prague
Czech expatriate ice hockey players in Slovakia